Mauk is an unincorporated community in Taylor County, Georgia, United States. It lies approximately 12 km south of Junction City.

History
The Georgia General Assembly incorporated Mauk as a town in 1913. The town's municipal charter was repealed in 1939.

Gallery

References

Former municipalities in Georgia (U.S. state)
Unincorporated communities in Georgia (U.S. state)
Unincorporated communities in Taylor County, Georgia